Stanly County is a county in the U.S. state of North Carolina. As of the 2020 census, the population was 62,504. Its county seat is Albemarle.

Stanly County comprises the Albemarle, NC Micropolitan Statistical Area, which is also included in the Charlotte-Concord, NC-South Carolina Combined Statistical Area.

History

The site of modern-day Stanly County was originally peopled by small tribes of hunter-gatherers and Mound Builders whose artifacts and settlements have been dated back nearly 10,000 years. Large-scale European settlement of the region came in the mid-18th century via two primary waves: immigrants of Dutch, Scots-Irish and German descent moved from Pennsylvania and New Jersey seeking enhanced religious and political tolerance, while immigrants of English backgrounds came to the region from Virginia and the Cape Fear River Basin in Eastern North Carolina.

In early English colonial times, the Stanly County area was politically part of the New Hanover Precinct, out of which the Bladen Precinct was created in 1734. The renamed Bladen County was subdivided to create Anson County in 1750, which in turn spawned Montgomery County in 1779.

Stanly County was formed in 1841 from the part of Montgomery County west of the Pee Dee River.  It was named for John Stanly of New Bern (1774–1834), who served several terms in the North Carolina House of Commons and two terms (1801–1803, 1809–1811) in the United States House of Representatives.

Hanging of Alec Whitley
Whitley was accused of theft and murder in Stanly County and also in Arkansas. Following a short manhunt through several states, he was captured by a local posse near Big Lick in 1892. Shortly after his capture and incarceration a mob of angry citizens gathered at the jail to demand Whitley be turned over to them. Sheriff Snuggs had been alerted to the mob's intention and he transferred all the prisoners from the jail to his own home across the street—except Whitley, who was seized by the mob, beaten, and hanged from a tree off South Street in Albemarle.

Name
Research by Chris Bramlett indicates that John Stanly had no connection with the area named for him, but that the name was chosen to please state legislators. Bramlett also believed that Stanly's father John Wright Stanly was named Stanley and changed the spelling. Because the county's name was often misspelled, in 1971 the North Carolina General Assembly passed legislation making the "Stanly" spelling official.

Geography

National protected area 
 Uwharrie National Forest (part)

State and local protected areas 
 Badin Lake Park
 City Lake Park
 Locust City Park
 Morrow Mountain State Park
 Roger F. Snyder Greenway
 Town of Oakboro District Park

Major water bodies 
 Badin Lake
 Big Bear Creek
 Island Creek
 Lake Tillery
 Little Bear Creek
 Little Creek
 Little Long Creek
 Long Creek
 Long Lake
 Mountain Creek
 Pee Dee River
 Riles Creek
 Rocky River
 Yadkin River

Adjacent counties
 Rowan County - north
 Davidson County - northeast
 Montgomery County - east
 Anson County - south
 Union County - south
 Richmond County - southeast
 Cabarrus County - west

Major highways

Major infrastructure 
 Stanly County Airport

Demographics

2020 census

As of the 2020 United States census, there were 62,504 people, 23,332 households, and 16,569 families residing in the county.

2010 census
As of the census of 2010, there were 60,585 people. In 2000 there were 22,223 households, and 16,156 families residing in the county.  The population density was 147 people per square mile (57/km2).  There were 24,582 housing units at an average density of 62 per square mile (24/km2).  The racial makeup of the county was 84.67% White, 11.46% Black or African American, 0.25% Native American, 1.81% Asian, 0.02% Pacific Islander, 1.01% from other races, and 0.79% from two or more races.  2.13% of the population were Hispanic or Latino of any race.

There were 22,223 households, out of which 32.60% had children under the age of 18 living with them, 58.30% were married couples living together, 10.50% had a female householder with no husband present, and 27.30% were non-families. 24.30% of all households were made up of individuals, and 10.80% had someone living alone who was 65 years of age or older.  The average household size was 2.53 and the average family size was 3.00.

In the county, the population was spread out, with 25.00% under the age of 18, 8.40% from 18 to 24, 29.00% from 25 to 44, 23.40% from 45 to 64, and 14.20% who were 65 years of age or older.  The median age was 37 years. For every 100 females there were 97.40 males.  For every 100 females age 18 and over, there were 94.70 males.

The median income for a household in the county was $36,898, and the median income for a family was $43,956. Males had a median income of $31,444 versus $21,585 for females. The per capita income for the county was $17,825.  About 8.10% of families and 10.70% of the population were below the poverty line, including 14.10% of those under age 18 and 10.30% of those age 65 or over.

Law and government

Stanly County is a member of the regional Centralina Council of Governments.

The current sheriff of Stanly County is Jeff Crisco.

Politics 
Stanly is currently a solidly Republican county. It has voted Republican in every presidential election since 1944, with the sole exception of 1976 when Southern Democrat Jimmy Carter carried the county. It did vote Democratic in every election from 1876 to 1900, but since then it has voted solidly Republican except in the 1912 Wilson and 1932 to 1940 Franklin Roosevelt landslides, and with southerners John W. Davis and Carter heading the Democratic tickets.

Education

Universities

 Pfeiffer University "Falcons"
 Stanly Community College "Eagles"

High schools
 Carolina Christian School "Lions"
 Gray Stone Day School "Knights"
 North Stanly High School "Comets"
 South Stanly High School "Bulls"
 Albemarle High School "Bulldogs"
 Stanly Early College "Tigers"
 West Stanly High School "Colts"
 Stanly Academy Learning Center

Middle schools
 Albemarle Middle School "Bulldogs
 Carolina Christian School "Lions"
 North Stanly Middle School "Comets"
 South Stanly Middle School "Rebels"
 West Stanly Middle School "Colts"

Elementary schools
 Aquadale Elementary "Little Bulls"
 Badin Elementary "Watts"
 Carolina Christian School "Lions"
 Central Elementary "Bulldogs"
 East Albemarle Elementary "Bullpups"
 Endy Elementary "Redskins"
 Locust Elementary "Colts"
 Millingport Elementary "Wildcats"
 Norwood Elementary "Patriots"
 Oakboro Elementary "Eagles"
 Richfield Elementary "Tigers"
 Stanfield Elementary "Wildcats"

Media
The area is served by The Weekly Post, a weekly newspaper.  It is also served by The Stanly News and Press, a tri-weekly newspaper that also posts local news on its website, www.thesnaponline.com.

There are 2 radio stations locally owned by Stanly Communications, Inc. WSPC broadcasts at 1010 AM and 107.3 FM, and the current format is primarily news and conservative talk radio.  WZKY broadcasts at 1580AM and 103.3 FM, and primarily plays music from the 1950s, 1960s, and 1970s.

Communities

Cities
 Albemarle (county seat and largest city)
 Locust

Towns

 Badin
 Misenheimer
 New London
 Norwood
 Oakboro
 Red Cross
 Richfield
 Stanfield

Townships

 Almond
 Big Lick
 Center
 Endy
 Furr
 Harris
 North Albemarle
 Ridenhour
 South Albemarle
 Tyson

Census-designated places
 Aquadale
 Millingport

Other unincorporated communities

 Beetsville
 Big Lick
 Cottonville
 Endy
 Finger
 Frog Pond
 Lambert
 Palestine
 Palmerville
 Plyler
 Porter
 Ridgecrest
 Tuckertown
 Kingville

See also
 List of counties in North Carolina
 National Register of Historic Places listings in Stanly County, North Carolina
 North Carolina State Parks

References

External links

 
 
 NCGenWeb Stanly County - free genealogy resources for the county

 
1841 establishments in North Carolina
Populated places established in 1841